Middleton-on-the-Wolds railway station was a railway station on the Selby to Driffield Line. It opened on 1 May 1890 and served the village of Middleton on the Wolds. It closed on 20 September 1954.

References

External links
 Middleton-on-the-Wolds station on navigable O.S. map
 

Disused railway stations in the East Riding of Yorkshire
Railway stations in Great Britain opened in 1890
Railway stations in Great Britain closed in 1954
Former North Eastern Railway (UK) stations